Brandon McInnis is an American voice actor and translator. He previously worked as a software engineer before pursuing a career as an actor after being convinced by his brother to do so. Some of his noteworthy roles include Finral in Black Clover, Yūta Hibiki in SSSS.Gridman, Gen Asagiri in Dr. Stone, Sir Nighteye in My Hero Academia, and Gyutaro in Demon Slayer: Kimetsu no Yaiba.

Biography
In high school, Brandon McInnis did musical theater. However, at the time he did not pursue acting and instead graduated from Austin College with a degree in Japanese. After working in Tokyo, he moved back to the United States to work as a software engineer. At the time, he had no plans of becoming an actor. However, his brother forced him to audition for the town's local performance of Les Misérables, where he was eventually cast as a major character. After that, McInnis decided to pursue a career in acting.

McInnis is openly bisexual and engaged to fellow voice actor J. Michael Tatum.

Filmography

Anime

Films

Video games

Drama CD

References

External links
 
 

21st-century American male actors
21st-century American translators
American bisexual actors
American male video game actors
American male voice actors
Japanese–English translators
Funimation
Living people
Year of birth missing (living people)
Bisexual male actors